Sir Julien Cahn's cricket team, captained by George Heane, toured New Zealand in February and March 1939 to play ten matches including one first-class fixture against the New Zealand national cricket team at Basin Reserve; this match was drawn. Cahn's XI also played three-day matches against the major provincial teams Canterbury, Otago and Auckland, but these matches were 12-a-side and are not regarded as first-class. Cahn's XI included the New Zealander Stewie Dempster, Joe Hardstaff junior, Buddy Oldfield, Eddie Phillipson and Peter Smith.

References

External links
Sir J Cahn's XI in New Zealand 1938-39 at CricketArchive

1939 in English cricket
1939 in New Zealand cricket
New Zealand cricket seasons from 1918–19 to 1944–45
English cricket tours of New Zealand
International cricket competitions from 1918–19 to 1945